Philip Hall FRS (11 April 1904 – 30 December 1982), was an English mathematician. His major work was on group theory, notably on finite groups and solvable groups.

Biography
He was educated first at Christ's Hospital, where he won the Thompson Gold Medal for mathematics, and later at King's College, Cambridge. He was elected a Fellow of the Royal Society in 1951 and awarded its Sylvester Medal in 1961. He was President of the London Mathematical Society in 1955–1957, and awarded its Berwick Prize in 1958 and De Morgan Medal in 1965.

Publications

See also
 Abstract clone
 Commutator collecting process
 Isoclinism of groups
 Regular p-group
 Three subgroups lemma
 Hall algebra, and Hall polynomials
 Hall subgroup
 Hall–Higman theorem
 Hall–Littlewood polynomial
 Hall's universal group
 Hall's marriage theorem
 Hall word
 Hall–Witt identity
 Irwin–Hall distribution
 Zappa–Szép product

References

1904 births
1982 deaths
20th-century  English mathematicians
Algebraists
Group theorists
People educated at Christ's Hospital
Alumni of King's College, Cambridge
Fellows of the Royal Society
Bletchley Park people
Presidents of the London Mathematical Society
Sadleirian Professors of Pure Mathematics